José Martins Ribeiro Nunes (5 January 1927 – 26 April 2012), also known as Zé Peixe or Joe Fish, was a maritime pilot. Unusually, rather than meeting and departing from the ships out at sea using a pilot boat, he would swim to and from the ships, jumping heights of more than 40 meters (130 ft) and swimming about  a day. Beneti Nascimento, a famous Brazilian writer, once wrote that "The greatness of this man is known all over the world, he is a living super-hero, with a sparkle in his eyes and always a smile. He is a man... who does not know what danger is, has no fear, not even when facing death."

José was a native from Aracaju, Brazil, where he practiced his profession from 1947.

References

External links
  "An article in Portuguese about José Nunes" April, 2007 Vida Simples
  "An article in German about José Nunes" June, 2003 Fish has to swim

1927 births
2012 deaths
People from Aracaju
Brazilian sailors